Harold Henning (3 October 1934 – 1 January 2004) was a South African professional golfer who played on the PGA Tour and the Senior PGA Tour.

Early life 
Henning was born in Johannesburg, South Africa. His brothers Allan, Brian, and Graham all became professional golfers.

Professional career 
Nicknamed The Horse, he turned pro in 1953. From 1953–1965, Henning traveled the world playing on international circuits, winning the national championships of Switzerland. South Africa, Italy, and Germany. A win with Gary Player at the 1965 Canada Cup convinced him to play on the PGA Tour.

In 1966 Henning won the PGA Tour's Texas Open. However, he was not a PGA Tour member yet and was expected to earn membership at 1966 PGA Tour Qualifying School. However, shortly before the tournament, the PGA Tour gave him an exemption from the event.

In 1970 Henning won the Tallahassee Open Invitational on the PGA Tour. He then retired in 1972.

He returned to the game six years later and recorded a victory at the KLM Dutch Open in 1981. Henning won the title in dramatic fashion, going out on the last hole of the tournament in the last group with Nick Price, both of them on seven under par. Ray Floyd stood in the clubhouse, having finished on seven under par. Henning went in to a greenside bunker with his third shot, while Price was on the green in three. Then Henning holed his bunker shot for a birdie 4 and won the tournament with one-shot-margin.

Upon reaching age 50 in October 1984, Henning began play on the Senior PGA Tour. During his 18 seasons on this Tour, he won three official events and two Liberty Mutual Legends of Golf Championships.

Personal life 
Henning died in 2004 after a long illness.

Professional wins (43)

PGA Tour wins (2)

PGA Tour playoff record (0–1)

European Tour wins (1)

Sunshine Tour wins (3) 
1972 South African PGA Championship, General Motors Open
1980 ICL International

Far East Circuit wins (1) 
1966 Malayan Open

Other South African wins (17)
1956 Natal Open, Cock of the North (Zambia)
1957 South African Open, Transvaal Open, 1.000 Guineas Anglo-African Tournament (Rhodesia)
1959 Cock of the North (Zambia), Western Province Open
1960 Northern Transvaal Open
1961 Natal Open
1962 South African Open
1965 South African PGA Championship
1966 South African PGA Championship, Kimberley Tournament (South Africa) (tie with Tony Jacklin), General Motors Open
1967 South African PGA Championship
1972 International Better-ball (with Graham Henning), Ellerines Team Tournament (with Graham Henning)

European circuit wins (12) 
1957 Italian Open
1958 Daks Tournament (tie with Peter Thomson), Yorkshire Evening News Tournament (tie with Eric Brown)
1959 Spalding Tournament (tie with Eric Lester)
1960 Swiss Open, Sprite International
1964 Swiss Open, Pringle of Scotland Tournament, Lancia d'Oro
1965 Swiss Open, German Open
1966 Engadine Open

New Zealand circuit wins (1)
1958 Wiseman's Tournament

Other wins (1)

Senior PGA Tour wins (3)

Senior PGA Tour playoff record (1–2)

Other senior wins (2)
1989 Liberty Mutual Legends of Golf (with Al Geiberger)
1993 Liberty Mutual Legends of Golf

Results in major championships

CUT = missed the half-way cut (3rd round cut in 1984 Open Championship)
"T" indicates a tie for a place

Summary

Most consecutive cuts made – 7 (1967 Open Championship – 1969 PGA)
Longest streak of top-10s – 1 (six times)

Team appearances
this list may be incomplete
World Cup (representing South Africa): 1957, 1958, 1959, 1961, 1965 (winners), 1966, 1967, 1970, 1971

References

External links

South African male golfers
PGA Tour golfers
European Tour golfers
PGA Tour Champions golfers
Golfers from Johannesburg
Sportspeople from Miami Beach, Florida
1934 births
2004 deaths
20th-century South African people